Anthony Michael Sparano Jr. (born October 22, 1986) is an American football coach who is the  offensive line coach for the Indianapolis Colts of the National Football League (NFL). He has previously served as the assistant DL coach of the Hartford Colonials, the quality control and offense coach for the Miami Dolphins, an offensive assistant for the New York Jets, and an assistant offensive line coach for the Carolina Panthers. He most recently had been the assistant offensive line coach of the New York Giants.

College
Sparano attended the University of Albany, playing defensive end, and made 24 career appearances; he earned three varsity letters and "2008 ESPN The Magazine All-District 1 Academic Team".

Coaching career

Hartford Colonials
Sparano started out his coaching career with the Hartford Colonials. They hired him as a defensive line assistant based on his experience as a defensive player for the University of Albany for three years and his background with his father Tony Sparano being the assistant coach for the Browns.

Miami Dolphins
After coaching a year there Sparano then moved to coach the Miami Dolphins as a quality control coach, where he was working under his father Tony Sparano.

New York Jets
After his father was fired from the Dolphins both Sparano men started coaching with the New York Jets in 2012. Tony started out coaching with the Jets as a seasonal intern and then an offensive intern. After his father was fired from the Jets as the assistant head coach, head coach Rex Ryan decided that he wanted to keep Tony and give him a promotion. Sparano accepted the promotion to offensive assistant and was said to be an asset to the team by doing "the job of a ton of guys" (Ryan).

Buffalo Bills
Sparano was with the Jets for three years and after Ryan was fired, he followed him when he became the new head coach for the Buffalo Bills.

On January 17, 2017, Sparano was replaced by Rob Boras as the Buffalo Bills tight ends' coach under Sean McDermott's new coaching staff.

Jacksonville Jaguars
On January 19, 2017, it was announced that Sparano would be joining the Jacksonville Jaguars as an assistant tight ends coach.

Carolina Panthers
On January 19, 2021, it was announced that Sparano would be joining the Carolina Panthers as an assistant offensive line coach.

New York Giants
On February 10, 2022, the New York Giants hired Sparano as an assistant offensive line coach.

Indianapolis Colts 
On February 27, 2023, the Indianapolis Colts hired Sparano as the offensive line coach.

Personal life
Sparano was born in Boston, Massachusetts, the son of former NFL head coach Tony Sparano.

Sparano is married and has four children: Anthony Jr., Gabriella, Mia and Gianna.

References

1986 births
Living people
Sportspeople from Boston
Miami Dolphins coaches
New York Jets coaches
Buffalo Bills coaches
Jacksonville Jaguars coaches
New York Giants coaches